Zheng Wantong (born ) is a Chinese male politician, who was the vice chairperson of the 11th National Committee of the Chinese People's Political Consultative Conference.

Career Data

References

External links 

1941 births
Living people

Chinese People's Political Consultative Conference